Guyger is a surname.  Notable people with the name include:

 Amber Guyger (born 1988), American police officer convicted in the murder of Botham Jean
 Steve Guyger (born 1952) American blues harmonica player, singer, and songwriter

See also
 Geiger (surname)